Gerald E. Loeb is an American neurophysiologist, biomedical engineer, academic and author. He is a Professor of Biomedical Engineering, Pharmacy and Neurology at the University of Southern California, the President of Biomed Concepts, and the co-founder of SynTouch.

Loeb's research is focused in the areas of neuroprosthetics and neural control techniques, sensorimotor control in mammals, implantable medical devices, and haptics for robots. He has done work on motor, visual, and auditory neuroprostheses, is most known for his feasibility experiments on prosthetic vision for the blind, and was also one of the developers of the cochlear implant to restore hearing to the deaf. He has contributed to numerous publications and is the co-author of the book Electromyography for Experimentalists

Loeb is a Fellow of the National Academy of Inventors and American Institute for Medical and Biological Engineering.

Early life and education
Born in New Brunswick, New Jersey, Loeb was raised in Manville, New Jersey and was the valedictorian of the class of 1965 at Manville High School.

He completed his Bachelor of Arts with a major in Human Biology in 1969 from Johns Hopkins University. He then pursued a Doctor of Medicine degree and completed it in 1972 from the Johns Hopkins University. He was a resident in surgery at the University of Arizona 1972–73.

Career
Loeb began his academic career in 1971 as a Guest Research Associate at the University of Utah. From 1973 to 1987, he was at the Laboratory of Neural Control of the National Institutes of Health, first as a Medical Officer, then Permanent Senior Investigator and finally Chief of the Neurokinesiology Section. He concurrently served as a Guest Researcher at the Department of Otolaryngology and Physiology at the UCSF School of Medicine from 1979 to 1981 and as an Adjunct Associate Professor of Bioengineering at the University of Utah from 1985 to 1987. Between 1988 and 1999, he was affiliated with Queen's University Kingston, where he served as a professor of physiology. As of 1999, he is affiliated with University of Southern California, serving in various capacities, including Professor of Biomedical Engineering and Neurology.

Loeb was the Director of the Biomedical Engineering Unit at the Queens University, Kingston, from 1991 to 1999 while concurrently serving as a member of Medical Research Council Group at the Queen's University from 1990 to 1999. As of 1999, he is the Director of the Medical Device Development Facility at the University of Southern California.

In 2003, he was founding deputy director of the NSF Engineering Research Center on Biomimetic MicroElectronic Systems and remained in the role until 2009. Later, he assumed the role of Chief Scientist at General Stim from 2012 to 2020 while concurrently serving as a Distinguished Scientist of the Strategic Advisory Committee of the Chinese Academy of Sciences from 2013 to 2015. He was a founder of Chironics in 2021 and was the Chief Consulting Scientist there until 2022. As of 2013, he serves on the board of directors at SynTouch, a company he co-founded in 2007.

Research
Loeb's work spans the fields of neural prosthetics, sensorimotor control, and biomedical engineering with a particular focus on developing medical devices and prosthetics using neural engineering techniques. He has authored numerous scientific articles, and has made contributions to the field of motor, visual, and auditory neuroprostheses. He also holds over 70 US patents on medical devices, and is the recipient of Technology Pioneer award from World Economic Forum.

Biomedical engineering and modelling
Loeb's early research presented evidence that cultured cells' bioelectric activity can be recorded and monitored by microelectrode arrays on the floor of the culture chambers. Loeb developed the Parylene process for making microelectrodes. He and his team demonstrated the feasibility of a visual prosthesis for the blind using such microelectrodes in the human brain.

Loeb was one of the inventors of the cochlear implant, which is used to restore functional hearing. He led the team that developed BIOnic Neurons that are miniscule in size and can be administered into paralyzed muscles, where they get power and transmit and receive data via radio links with an external transmitter coil. He and his team invented a micropacemaker that can be recharged inductively and injected into a developing fetus through a percutaneous procedure. He also developed a biomimetic tactile sensor named BioTac, later commercialized by Syntouch. With regards to his sensorimotor nervous system research, he developed computer models that utilize empirical data derived from muscles, motoneurons, and proprioceptors to test control theories and highlighted the potential to enable the functional electrical stimulation of paralyzed limbs, which could ultimately lead to their successful restoration to a functional state.

Experimental physiology
Loeb developed new techniques to record the activity of sensory neurons in freely behaving animals and highlighted the complexity of neural processing of muscle spindle afferents during different types of movement. Exploring the discharge patterns of hindlimb motor neurons in cats, he identified rate modulation as a significant component in force regulation. Later, he and his team developed a computerized processing system that digitized the electromyography (EMG), and computed the auto- and cross-correlation products, demonstrating broad motor unit synchronization during certain slow movements in cats.

Loeb has also conducted research on human physiology, particularly focusing on the control of postures and movements. His models of musculoskeletal systems and spinal circuits demonstrated how the human brain could acquire motor skills through trial and error and then remember these movements as habits, later facilitating the brain in controlling movements in an effective and consistent manner, especially when acquiring new skills. Recently he and his collaborators have studied the ability of humans to initiate very fast reaches to targets by utilizing the tecto-reticulo-spinal pathway that bypasses the cerebral cortex.

Awards and honors
1969 – Fellowship, Seeing Eye.
1983 – Commendation Medal, U.S. Public Health Service 
2001 – Fellow, American Institute for Medical and Biological Engineering
2013 – Breakthrough Innovator Award, Popular Mechanics
2014 – Technology Pioneer, World Economic Forum
2020 – Fellow, National Academy of Inventors
2022 – Top 200 Best Scientists in Engineering and Technology, Research.com

Bibliography

Books
Electromyography for Experimentalists (1986)

Selected articles
Thomas Jr, C. A., Springer, P. A., Loeb, G. E., Berwald-Netter, Y., & Okun, L. M. (1972). A miniature microelectrode array to monitor the bioelectric activity of cultured cells. Experimental cell research, 74(1), 61–66.
Loeb, G.E., Bak, M.J. and Duysens, J.  Long-term unit recording from somatosensory neurons in the spinal ganglia of the freely walking cat.  Science  197:1192-1194, 1977.
Loeb, G.E., Byers, C.L., Rebscher, S.J., Casey, D.E., Fong, M.M., Schindler, R.A., Gray, R.F. and Merzenich, M.M.  Design and fabrication of an experimental cochlear prosthesis.  Med. & Biol. Engng. & Comput.  21:241-254, 1983.
Schulman, J.H., Loeb, G.E., Gord, J.C .and Stroynik, P.  Implantable microstimulator, U.S. Patent #5,193,539.  March 18, 1993.
Loeb, G.E. and Fishel, J.A.  Bayesian Action & Perception: Representing the World in the Brain,  Frontiers in Neuroscience  8:341,  doi: 10.3389/fnins.2014.00341, 2014.

References 

Living people
American physicians
Johns Hopkins University alumni
People from Manville, New Jersey
People from New Brunswick, New Jersey
University of Southern California faculty